Concord Jazz is a record company and label founded in 1973 by Carl Jefferson, the former owner of Jefferson Motors Lincoln Mercury dealership in Concord, California. The label was named after the city in the East San Francisco Bay area, and the jazz festival which Jefferson also began. The label issued recordings by Art Blakey, Cannonball Adderley, Stan Getz, Ray Brown, Rosemary Clooney, Chick Corea, Eliane Elias, and Kurt Elling. It is owned by Concord.

Artists

Cannonball Adderley
Howard Alden
Herb Alpert
Monty Alexander
Steve Allen
Eden Atwood
George Barnes
Ray Barretto
Count Basie
Art Blakey
Terence Blanchard
Willie Bobo
Ruby Braff
Randy Brecker
Butcher Brown
Ray Brown
Dave Brubeck
Charlie Byrd
Frank Capp
Betty Carter
Ray Charles
Rosemary Clooney
John Collins
Bing Crosby
Jorge Dalto
Buddy DeFranco
Kurt Elling
Herb Ellis
Chris Flory
Stan Getz
Scott Hamilton
Gene Harris
Donald Harrison
Barney Kessel
Henry Mancini
Tania Maria
Rob McConnell
Dave McKenna
Marian McPartland
Carmen McRae
Peter Nero
Joe Pass
Nat Pierce
Tito Puente
Benny Reid
Emily Remler
Poncho Sanchez
George Shearing
Cal Tjader
Mel Tormé
Joe Venuti

References

American record labels
Jazz record labels
Concord Music Group
Record labels based in California
Labels distributed by Universal Music Group
Record labels established in 1973
.